María Mercedes Fontecilla y Fernández de Valdivieso (June 18, 1799 – May 5, 1853) was a First Lady of Chile for less than two months in 1814 through her marriage to José Miguel Carrera.

Biography
Fontecilla was born to Diego Antonio Fontecilla Palacios and Rosa Valdivieso Protusagasti in Santiago. On 20 August 1814, at 15, Fontecilla married 29 year old José Miguel Carrera, a political leader in Chile, at the Santiago Metropolitan Cathedral. Less than two months later, Carrera's forces were defeated in the Battle of Rancagua and the family, including Carrera's two brothers, fled to Mendoza, Argentina. While there, Fontecilla passed secret information between military personnel and sewed clothing for soldiers. Fontecilla supported and was affectionate towards her husband despite his long absences to Anapolis, Montevideo, and Buenos Aires as he sought allies to fight for Chilean independence.

In 1821, Carrera was handed over to Colonel José Albino Gutiérrez as prisoner by his own men. Within days, he was tried, sentenced, and executed. The morning of his death, he wrote Mercedes a letter, in which he told her of his imminent execution and expressed regret for leaving her to care for their five children. Following Carrera's death, Fontecilla and her children lived in extreme poverty in Rosario. Eventually, Bernardo O'Higgins, Chile's Supreme Director and one of Carrera's main enemies, allowed them to return to Chile, largely due to "good public relations... [so the public would think] '[O'Higgins] was as generous as he was courageous.'" She later married politician Diego José Benavente, with whom she had four children.

Family
Marriage: José Miguel Carrera (1814-1821, his death)
 Francisca Javiera Carrera Fontecilla (1817-1850; wife of Francisco Javier Valdés Aldunate and mother of José Miguel Valdés)
 Roberta Carrera Fontecilla
 Rosa Carrera Fontecilla (1819-1862; wife of Ambrosio Aldunate Carvajal, mother of Luis Aldunate)
 Josefa Carrera Fontecilla (1820-1898; wife of José Ramón Lira Calvo)
 José Miguel Carrera Fontecilla (es) (1820-1860); husband of Emilia Pinto Benavente, father of Ignacio Carrera Pinto)

Marriage: Diego José Benavente
 José Benjamín Benavente Fontecilla (husband of Rosa Vargas González)
 Mercedes Quiteria Benavente Fontecilla (wife of Miguel Calvo Valenzuela)
 Mariana Benavente Fontecilla
 Carolina Benavente Fontecilla

Legacy
There is a school in the Quilicura area of Santiago, Chile named Escuela Mercedes Fontecilla de Carrera. Javiera Díaz de Valdés, a descendent of Fontecilla's sister-in-law Javiera Carrera, portrayed her in the Chilean miniseries Héroes.

See also
Carrera family
First Lady of Chile

References

1799 births
1853 deaths
First ladies of Chile
People from Santiago
19th-century Chilean people